Oofotr II (released 2001 in Norway by Grappa Music, Heilo catalog - HCD 7169) is a Norwegian studioalbum by the band Oofotr performing traditional music from Ofoten like World Ambient in a Nordic Traditional style.

Review 
Oofotr II is the second album from this acclaimed Norwegian jazz trio. The project of presenting electronic versions of traditional music from Ofoten in Nordland, is resilient and deserve attention. Keyboardist Jørn Øien and Arve Furset, drummer Ernst Wiggo Sandbakk and vocalist Kjersti Stubø creates intense soundscapes, heavily melody-based, but with a wide enough range of rhythms, harmonies, beats and timbres that they are far more interesting music to listen to, than a lot of other computer based music. The term ambient world is printed on the cover, and it may so be, but the album consists of a series of fine tunes anyway.

Reception 
The review by the Norwegian newspaper Dagbladet awarded the album dice 4.

Personnel 
Standard lineup
Ernst-Wiggo Sandbakk - drums and percussions
Jørn Øien - keyboards
Kjersti Stubø - vocals

Additional musicians
Arve Furset - keyboard
Gunnar Andreas Berg - guitar
Ivar Gafseth - vocals

Track listing 
«Meeting Of The Hidden» (5:35), vocals by Ivar Gafseth
«The Soul» (4:56)
«New World» (3:34)
«The Message» (6:42)
«Walking In The Desert» (4:01)
«O Lam jeg Ser» (3:13)
«Poorboy» (4:41)
«Where You Go» (6:51)
«Land Of Babel» (5:15), feat. Gunnar Andreas Berg (mixed by Rune Holme)
«The Face» (6:42)

Credits 
Featuring Arve Furset
All titles based on trad folk songs from Ofoten, Norway
Recorded and mixed in Volt Studio, Oslo
Engineer Arve Furset
Mastered in Skansen Lydstudio, Trondheim, by Stein Brattland
Tracks 1, 2, 4, 6, 7, 8 produced by Arve Furset and Ernst Wiggo Sandbakk
Tracks 3, 5, 9 produced by Arve Furset and Jørn Øien
Executive producer: Ernst Wiggo Sandbakk

References 

2001 albums
Oofotr albums